Speed is a 1984 documentary written and directed by Greg MacGillivray of MacGillivray Freeman Films which chronicles the development of human technology as part of our desire to go faster than before.

It was originally produced for Six Flags Autoworld in Flint, Michigan.

In 1994 Knowledge Adventure worked with IMAX to make an MS-DOS game of the film.

External links

American documentary films
1984 films
IMAX short films
Short films directed by Greg MacGillivray
1984 documentary films
Documentary films about transport
1984 short films
MacGillivray Freeman Films films
IMAX documentary films
1980s English-language films
1980s American films